Cais do Sodré is a name shared by two railway stations and a ferry station in Lisbon, Portugal:

 Cais do Sodré railway station
 Cais do Sodré (Lisbon Metro)
 Cais do Sodré, ferry station (allowing for quick travel between Lisbon and Cacilhas, Seixal and Montijo)

Buildings and structures in Lisbon
Districts of Lisbon